During the 1978-79 season Catanzaro competed in Serie A and Coppa Italia.

Squad

Competitions

Overview

Serie A

League table

Results summary

 Note: Wins were only worth 2 points this season

Results by round

Matches

Coppa Italia

Group stage: Group 4

Table

Group matches

Quarterfinals

Semifinals

Squad statistics

References 
 calcio-seria.net 
 historical-lineups.com 
 webalice.it 

Catanzaro
U.S. Catanzaro 1929 seasons